William P. Bless (May 27, 1939 – May 6, 2016) was an American football and track coach. Bless He served as head football coach at the University of Indianapolis—known as Indiana Central College until 1986—from 1972 to 1993, compiling a record of 114–99–9. Bless had a record of 26–21–1 as head football coach at Greensburg and Whiteland high schools in the state of Indiana before coming to Indiana Central in 1970 as head track coach and assistant football coach under Dick Nyers.

Head coaching record

College football

References

External links
 

1939 births
2016 deaths
Indianapolis Greyhounds football coaches
Indianapolis Greyhounds football players
College track and field coaches in the United States
High school football coaches in Indiana
Players of American football from Indianapolis